Merode may refer to:

People
 House of Merode, a princely dynasty belonging to the Belgian nobility
 Jean Philippe Eugène de Mérode (1674–1732), Imperial Field Marshal
 Félix de Mérode (1791–1857), Belgian politician
 Xavier de Mérode (1820–1874), Belgian prelate and statesman
 Antoinette de Mérode (1828–1864), Princess of Monaco, married Charles III, Prince of Monaco
 Cléo de Mérode (1875–1966), French dancer of the Belle Époque
 Prince Alexandre de Mérode (1934–2002), head of drug testing policy for the IOC
 Emmanuel de Merode (born 1970), Director of Virunga National Park, Democratic Republic of the Congo
 Master of Merode or Robert Campin (c. 1375–1444), a master of Flemish and Early Netherlandish painting

Other uses
 Mérode Altarpiece, a triptych in The Cloisters, New York City, New York, U.S.
 Mérode Cup, a medieval silver-gilt cup that once belonged to the Merode family
 Merode station, a railway and metro station in Brussels
 MERODE, an Object Oriented Enterprise Modeling method